Timewind is the fifth album by Klaus Schulze. It was originally released in 1975, and in 2006 was the twenty-second Schulze album reissued by Revisited Records. It is Schulze's first solo album to use a sequencer.

For many years this was his only work available in the United States and was therefore rated higher by American listeners than 1977's Mirage or X of the following year. It was awarded the Grand Prix du Disque (Grand Prize for Records) of L'Académie Charles Cros.

Overview
Evolving slowly but deliberately over the course of each album side, Timewind has been deemed an electronic version of an Indian raga. It resembles in many ways a longer variation of the third track from Tangerine Dream's classic 1974 album Phaedra, "Movements of a Visionary," but it remains a transitional work somewhere between the Krautrock of Schulze's earlier output and the Berlin School character of his following efforts. The intention of Timewind was to invoke a timeless state in the listener.

Both track titles are references to the nineteenth-century composer Richard Wagner. Bayreuth is the Bavarian town where Wagner had an opera house built for the first performance of his massive Ring Cycle. Wahnfried is the name of Wagner's home in Bayreuth in the grounds of which he was buried in 1883. It is also a pen-name used by Schulze himself.

"Bayreuth Return" was recorded on two-track equipment in one take, and is essentially "live in the studio". Its rhythmic basis is a single analog sequencer pattern, transposed and manipulated in real time. (The manipulation primarily consists of changing the 'return' point of the sequence.) String synthesizer chords, improvised melodies, and complex sound effects are the remaining ingredients. "Wahnfried 1883", in contrast, is a slow piece that was composed and multitracked. Its main building blocks are layers of slow, shimmering pads and lines. The kaleidoscopic key changes without obvious 'home key' (the piece remains consonant throughout) may be seen as a musical nod to Wagner: also, a Leitmotif appears. An excerpt of the graphic performance score appears on the inside sleeve of the original vinyl version. The reissue bonus track "Echoes of Time" is a longer alternate take of "Bayreuth Return".

Track listing
All tracks composed by Klaus Schulze.

Disc 1

Disc 2

Personnel
 Klaus Schulze – ARP 2600, ARP Odyssey, EMS Synthi-A, Elka String Synthesizer, Farfisa Professional Duo Organ and Piano, Synthanorma Sequencer.

References

External links
 Timewind at the official site of Klaus Schulze
 

Klaus Schulze albums
1975 albums